Samuel Watts (born March 14, 1948) is an American former professional basketball player. He played in the American Basketball Association for the Pittsburgh Condors during the 1970–71 season. In his ABA career he scored 281 points. In September 1971, Watts attempted to play his way onto the NBA's Chicago Bulls final roster but was released on waivers during the preseason.

Prior to playing professionally, Watts played at Northwest Community College (later renamed "Coast Mountain College") in British Columbia, Florida A&M University, and the University of Great Falls (1968–70).

References

1948 births
Living people
American men's basketball players
Basketball players from Gary, Indiana
Florida A&M Rattlers basketball players
Junior college men's basketball players in the United States
Pittsburgh Condors players
Shooting guards
University of Providence alumni